This is a list of the mammal species recorded in French Southern Territories. There are nineteen mammal species in French Southern Territories, of which two are endangered.

The following tags are used to highlight each species' conservation status as assessed by the International Union for Conservation of Nature:

Order: Cetacea (whales) 

The order Cetacea includes whales, dolphins and porpoises. They are the mammals most fully adapted to aquatic life with a spindle-shaped nearly hairless body, protected by a thick layer of blubber, and forelimbs and tail modified to provide propulsion underwater.

Suborder: Mysticeti
Family: Balaenidae
Genus: Eubalaena
 Southern right whale, Eubalaena australis 
Family: Balaenopteridae
Subfamily: Balaenopterinae
Genus: Balaenoptera
 Blue whale, Balaenoptera musculus   (globally)
Antarctic sub-species  Balaenoptera intermedia 
 Fin whale, Balaenoptera physalus 
Family: Neobalaenidae
Genus: Caperea
 Pygmy right whale, Caperea marginata 
Suborder: Odontoceti
Superfamily: Platanistoidea
Family: Phocoenidae
Genus: Phocoena
 Spectacled porpoise, Phocoena dioptrica 
Family: Ziphidae
Genus: Berardius
 Giant beaked whale, Berardius arnuxii 
Subfamily: Hyperoodontinae
Genus: Mesoplodon
 Gray's beaked whale, Mesoplodon grayi 
 Layard's beaked whale, Mesoplodon layardii 
Family: Delphinidae (marine dolphins)
Genus: Cephalorhynchus
 Commerson's dolphin, Cephalorhynchus commersonii 
Genus: Lissodelphis
 Southern right whale dolphin, Lissodelphis peronii 
Genus: Sagmatias
 Dusky dolphin, Sagmatias obscurus 
Genus: Orcinus
 Orca, Orcinus orca 
Genus: Globicephala
 Pilot whale, Globicephala melas

Order: Carnivora (carnivorans) 

There are over 260 species of carnivorans, the majority of which feed primarily on meat. They have a characteristic skull shape and dentition. 

Suborder: Caniformia
Family: Otariidae (eared seals, sea lions)
Genus: Arctophoca
 Antarctic fur seal, Arctophoca gazella 
 Subantarctic fur seal, Arctophoca tropicalis 
Family: Phocidae (earless seals)
Genus: Hydrurga
 Leopard seal, Hydrurga leptonyx 
Genus: Leptonychotes
 Weddell seal, Leptonychotes weddellii 
Genus: Mirounga
 Southern elephant seal, Mirounga leonina 
Genus: Ommatophoca
 Ross seal, Ommatophoca rossii

See also
List of chordate orders
List of mammals described in the 2000s
List of prehistoric mammals
Lists of mammals by region
Mammal classification

Notes

References
 

French Southern Territories